This is a list of vice presidents of the Croatian Republic of Herzeg-Bosnia, an unrecognized state.

Below is a list of office-holders:

Sources 
Eastern Europe and the Commonwealth of Independent States 1993

Politics of the Croatian Republic of Herceg-Bosna
Croatian Republic of Herzeg-Bosnia